Burwood Bus Depot is a bus depot in the Sydney suburb of Burwood operated by Transit Systems

History
Burwood Bus Depot was purchased by the Department of Road Transport & Tramways from the Metropolitan Omnibus Transport Company in 1933. As part of the contracting out of region 6, operation of Burwood depot passed from State Transit to Transit Systems on 1 July 2018.

As of November 2022, it has an allocation of 113 buses.

References

External links
Service NSW

Bus garages
Industrial buildings in Sydney
Transport infrastructure completed in 1933
1933 establishments in Australia